Patak-e Jalali (also Romanized as Patak-e Jalālī; also known as Pelak Jalāli and Penīk) is a village in Saroleh Rural District, Meydavud District, Bagh-e Malek County, Khuzestan Province, Iran. At the 2006 census, its population was 1,975, in 367 families.

References 

Populated places in Bagh-e Malek County